(), Matzleinsdorf Evangelical  Cemetery   is a historic Protestant cemetery located in the Favoriten district of Vienna, the capital city of Austria.

History and details
Throughout the centuries, the Vienna Protestants did not have their own graveyard but were buried among Catholics in Catholic cemeteries. In May 1856 Emperor Franz Joseph I of Austria agreed to reformations which allowed for the creation of cemeteries of other denominations.

The Protestant church acquired a plot of land at the outlying village of Matzleinsdorf that same year and began the construction of their first cemetery in Vienna. The original plans included a chapel, a home for undertakers, a mortuary and various storage facilities. The famous Austrian architect Theophil Hansen was contracted for the project. However the construction of the cemetery would take two years as the Protestant church ran out of money and needed to finance construction through donations. On May 7, 1858 the Matzleinsdorf Protestant Cemetery finally opened and on September 27, 1860 the chapel Christuskirche (Chapel of the Holy Christ) was completed and consecrated.

The Chapel has a distinct architectural style which is reminiscent of an Eastern Orthodox Church. The architect, Theophil Hansen, was influenced heavily by historical features prominent during the 19th century and constructed the church in a Byzantium style with a large dome and crowned corner pillars. The entrance has a golden mosaic that shows Christ holding a holy scroll. The interior of the chapel is characterized by 35 statues of angels made in a style similar to figureheads of Spanish galleons. They symbolize worship, dogma and annunciation. The ornate stained glass windows are ornamented with Christian symbols and pictures of birth, crucifixion and resurrection of the Christ.

During its long history, the Matzleinsdorf cemetery became so popular among the Viennese Protestants that it needed to be enlarged twice due to a lack of space. However, when the Zentralfriedhof got its own Protestant section, the Matzleinsdorf fell into disuse and discussion about its retention embarked and lasts ever since. Finally, in 1943 the cemetery suffered heavy destruction during Allied bombings due to its proximity to the Vienna Railway Station South, a primary target of the Allied forces. Today, it has been largely restored but still suffers from competition of the more popular Protestant Section at Zentralfriedhof.

Selected notable burials
A few of the notables buried here are:
 Heinrich Anschütz (1785–1865), German actor
 Karl Isidor Beck (1817–1879), Austrian poet
 Count Friedrich Ferdinand von Beust (1809–1886), Austrian statesman
 Karl Ludwig von Bruck (1798–1860), Austrian statesman
 Ada Christen (1839–1901), Austrian writer
 Christine Enghaus (1815–1910), German actress 
 Christian Friedrich Hebbel (1813–1863), German poet and dramatist
 Oskar Karlweis (1894–1956), Austrian actor
 Rudolf Koppitz (1884–1936), Austrian photographer
 Heinrich Laube (1806–1884), German dramatist, novelist and theatre-director
 Hermann Nothnagel (1841–1905), German internist
 František Martin Pecháček (1763–1816), Czech violinist and composer
 Adele Sandrock (1863–1937), German actress
 Lorenz von Stein (1815–1890), German economist, sociologist, and public administration scholar
 Hans Thirring (1888–1976), Austrian theoretical physicist, professor, and father of the physicist Walter Thirring
 Otto Weininger (1880–1903), Austrian philosopher

Gallery

External links 
 Website of the Matzleinsdorf Evangelical Cemetery
 Evangelischer Friedhof Matzleinsdorf auf den Seiten der Friedhöfe Wien GmbH
 Evangelische Pfarrgemeinde Wien Christuskirche A.B.

Cemeteries in Vienna
Lutheran cemeteries
Protestant Reformed cemeteries
Buildings and structures in Favoriten